Bertiolo is a comune (municipality) in the Province of Udine in the Italian region Friuli-Venezia Giulia, located about  northwest of Trieste and about  southwest of Udine.

Bertiolo borders the following municipalities: Codroipo, Lestizza, Rivignano Teor, Talmassons, Varmo.

References

External links
 Official website 

Cities and towns in Friuli-Venezia Giulia